is a Japanese bobsledder who has competed at the 2006 Winter Olympics  in Turin, Italy.
She, along with Manami Hino, was the first Japanese women's pair to participate in the bobsleigh events in the Winter Olympics.

Performance
She earned her best finish of 15th in the two-woman event at the 2006 Winter Olympics.
She finished 1st in the two-woman event at the All Japan Bobsleigh Championships in a pair with Manami Hino for two consecutive years between 2006–2008, held at the Nagano Bobsleigh-Luge Park, Japan.

References
 
 Sports-Reference.com profile
 Tenri University, Sport Studies  profile 

1976 births
Living people
Japanese female bobsledders
Bobsledders at the 2006 Winter Olympics
Olympic bobsledders of Japan